Fultz is a surname. Notable people with the surname include:

Aaron Fultz, baseball player
Brent Fultz, American material scientist
Dave Fultz, baseball player and college football coach
Dave Fultz (meteorologist), American experimental meteorologist 1921-2002
Frank Fultz, former strength and conditioning coach
Jack Fultz, long-distance runner
Markelle Fultz (born 1998), American basketball player

See also
Fultz House, one of the earliest houses in Lower Sackville, Nova Scotia